¡Mira Quien Baila! (also known as Mira Quien Baila 2013 and Mira Quien Baila 4) debuted on Univision on September 15, 2013 at 8pm/7c. The TV series is the Spanish version of British version Strictly Come Dancing and American version Dancing with the Stars. Ten celebrities are paired with ten professional ballroom dancers. The winner will receive $185,000 for their charity. Javier Posa and Chiquinquirá Delgado return as the show's hosts. Horacio Villalobos and Bianca Marroquin continue as the judges this season, with Ninel Conde replacing Lili Estefan.

Celebrities
The names of ten celebrities were revealed on July 18, 2013 during the broadcast of 2013 Premios Juventud.

Scores 

Red numbers indicate the lowest score for each week.
Green numbers indicate the highest score for each week.
 indicates the couple eliminated that week.
 indicates the couple withdrew from the competition.
 indicates the couple that was safe but withdrew from the competition.
 indicates the winning couple.
 indicates the runner-up couple.
 indicates the third-place couple.

References

2013 American television seasons